Bruno de Camargo Agnello, better known as Bruno Agnello (born 7 December 1985 in Santos) is a left-footed Brazilian football (soccer) midfielder who currently plays for Alianza Atlético.

Career

Youth teams
Bruno Agnello starts playing soccer at 8 years old, in Santos FC youth teams, playing indoor soccer for Santos as well. Played there until 2001 in U-19 squad, playing together with well-known players like Robinho and Diego.

Professional
After, he signed his first professional contract with Portuguesa Santista (the second team in the city of Santos-SP) in 2002, staying in 3rd place in Paulista Championship 1st division, losing the semi-final against São Paulo FC.

Al Hilal (Saudi Arabia)
In 2007, he signed for Al-Hilal from Saudi Premier League for one season.

Portugal
The last 2012–2013 mid season, he joined U.D. Oliveirense from Second Division of Portugal.

Ecuador

In July 2015, he went to Deportivo Cuenca.

References

External links

 Bruno Agnello, la nueva ilusión de Deportivo Cuenca
 
 Zerozero.pt Database
 www.maisfutebol.iol.pt/noticias/bruno-agnello-oliveirense-santos/1415328-1192.html
 Futebol365 profile
 Entrevista Bruno Agnello Maniacos por Futebol
 www.br.soccerway.com/players/bruno-de-camargo-agnello/124524
 Homenagem Campeoes 1978 Claudinho Agnello
 Claudinho Agnello
 America-SP Website
 
 Al-Hilal transfer
 Al Hilal Website profile

1985 births
Living people
Al Hilal SFC players
Associação Atlética Portuguesa (Santos) players
Brazilian footballers
Santos FC players
U.D. Oliveirense players
Saudi Professional League players
Brazilian expatriate footballers
Expatriate footballers in Portugal
Expatriate footballers in Saudi Arabia
Brazilian expatriate sportspeople in Saudi Arabia
Expatriate footballers in South Korea
Brazilian expatriate sportspeople in South Korea
Expatriate footballers in Ecuador
Brazilian expatriate sportspeople in Ecuador
Association football midfielders
Sportspeople from Santos, São Paulo